Chris or Christopher Wright may refer to:

Chris
 Chris Wright (activist) (born 1957), American cannabis rights activist
 Chris Wright (anthropologist) (20th Century), British visual anthropologist
 Chris Wright (basketball, born 1988), American professional basketball player, University of Dayton college player
 Chris Wright (basketball, born 1989), American professional basketball player, Georgetown University college player
 Chris Wright (Big Brother) (born c.1981), British Big Brother contestant
 Chris Wright (Canadian football) (1972–2005), Canadian football player
 Chris Wright (cricketer) (born 1985), English cricketer
 Chris Wright (footballer) (born 1986), English footballer
 Chris Wright (music industry executive) (born 1944), British businessman, founder of Chrysalis
 Chris Wright (programmer) (21st Century), Linux kernel hacker
 Chris Wright (swimmer) (born 1988), Australian swimmer
 Chris Wright (technologist) (20th Century), founder of Soundscape Digital Technology

Christopher
 Christopher Wright (born 1971), better known as C. W. Anderson, American professional wrestler
 Christopher Wright (academic) (20th Century), British academic
 Christopher Wright (author) (born 1964), American writer
 Christopher Wright (plotter) (c. 1570–1605), English conspirator in the Gunpowder Plot
 Christopher J. H. Wright (born 1947), Anglican clergyman and Old Testament scholar